Allison Tait, who also writes under the pen name A. L. Tait, is an Australian freelance writer and children's author. She writes children’s literature and non-fiction, and is a blogger. She is best known for her middle grade series The Mapmaker Chronicles. Her work has been published in various magazines, newspapers, and online over the last 20 years. Her freelance writing is varied covering topics like finance, furniture, parenting, philosophy, social trends, sex, and others. She currently co-hosts the Your Kid's Next Read podcast with Megan Daley, and previously co-hosted the Australian Writers' Centre branded podcast So You Want To Be A Writer with Valerie Khoo.

Biography
Tait grew up with two sisters and a brother. She now lives in a small country town in Shoalhaven on the south coast of NSW. Tait's son is Joe Visser, a singer-songwriter. Tait often speaks of her Border Collie, Scout, who she refers to as ‘procrastipup’.

Career
As well as writing, Tait is currently an online tutor for writing-based courses. She also engages in a range of public speaking and workshopping events targeting both adults and children with subject matter on writing, blogging, social media, and work/life balance. In the past, Tait has worked for Cleo (magazine), House & Garden, and Vogue (magazine)(Australia).

The Mapmaker Chronicles
The Mapmaker Chronicles consists of three books. The first novel, Race to the End of the World, was shortlisted for: Readings Children’s Book Prize 2015, 2016 YABBA Awards, 2016 KOALA Awards, 2016 KROC Awards, 2017 WAYRBA Awards, and was a notable book for  Children's Book Council of Australia Book of the Year 2015. The second, Prisoner of the Black Hawk, was shortlisted for the 2015 Aurealis Award. The chronicles were also optioned for film in 2015.

Bibliography

References

21st-century English novelists
21st-century Australian novelists
Living people
Australian children's writers
Year of birth missing (living people)